The following list of Carnegie libraries in Oklahoma provides detailed information on United States Carnegie libraries in Oklahoma, where 24 public libraries were built from 24 grants (totaling $464,500) awarded by the Carnegie Corporation of New York from 1899 to 1916. In addition, an academic library was built at the University of Oklahoma in Norman from a $30,000 grant given February 20, 1903.

Key

Public libraries

Notes

References

Note: The above references, while all authoritative, are not entirely mutually consistent. Some details of this list may have been drawn from one of the references without support from the others.  Reader discretion is advised.

Oklahoma
Libraries
 
Libraries